1450 Brickell, is an all-office skyscraper in the City of Miami, Florida, United States. It is 540 feet (165 m) tall with 35 floors. It is adjacent to One Broadway in Downtown Miami's southern Brickell Financial District. The building is located on the corner of Brickell Avenue and Broadway. The project is one of several new office buildings to open in Downtown Miami.

Energy efficiency

1450 Brickell is Miami's first LEED Gold office building.  Hill York, a mechanical contractor, built the utiliVisor system in the building to continuously commission the building's HVAC systems.

Hurricane resistance
At the time of completion, 1450 Brickell incorporated the strongest curtainwall window system of any commercial building in the nation. The entire 35-story glass curtainwall system is designed for large-missile impact (hurricane resistance), even though Miami-Dade County only requires glass in the first  of a building to be large-missile impact-resistant.  DeSimone Consulting Engineers is the structural engineering firm for the project.

See also
List of tallest buildings in Miami
 List of tallest buildings in Florida
 Downtown Miami

References
Notes

External links
 Official website

Office buildings completed in 2010
Skyscraper office buildings in Miami
2010 establishments in Florida